Allen Stephen Covert (born October 12, 1964) is an American comedian, actor, writer, and producer. He is best known for his starring role in the 2006 comedy film Grandma's Boy, and his supporting actor role in the movie Strange Wilderness (2008). He is a frequent collaborator with actor and friend Adam Sandler with prominent roles in such films as Happy Gilmore (1996), The Wedding Singer (1998), Big Daddy (1999), Little Nicky (2000), Mr. Deeds (2002), Anger Management (2003), 50 First Dates (2004) and I Now Pronounce You Chuck and Larry (2007).

Life
Covert was born in West Palm Beach, Florida, the son of Elizabeth Ann (née Duhy) and Stephen Covert. His father was Jewish, and his mother was a Southern Baptist. He studied theater at New York University, where he was a classmate of Adam Sandler. Covert has served as a performer, writer, and/or producer for almost every film and comedy album Sandler has ever released.

He married Kathryn Ashley Hagstrom on February 14, 2006. In July 2019, Hagstrom filed for divorce; it was finalized in November 2019.

Career
Covert's first film role was a cruise ship bartender in Sandler's 1989 film Going Overboard which also was Sandler's first cinematic appearance. Covert had minor parts in several subsequent Sandler films such as Otto the homeless caddy in Happy Gilmore, before his first prominent role in 1998's The Wedding Singer alongside Sandler and Drew Barrymore. Covert would continue to have roles in Sandler's next four films, including one in Little Nicky for which he gained 40 pounds. He eventually settled back into walk-on and single-scene appearances in Sandler's films beginning with 50 First Dates in 2004.

In 2006, Covert starred in the comedy film Grandma's Boy, his first (and only) lead role. Sandler served as an executive producer. Covert has also had small roles in four films that neither star nor are produced by Sandler: Never Been Kissed, Late Last Night, Heavyweights, and The Cable Guy.

Although Covert's on-screen presence has been reduced in recent years, he has continued to serve an active role in Sandler's movie production company, Happy Madison Productions, where Covert is an executive producer and sometimes co-writer on most of the company's films. In addition, Covert has contributed heavily to Sandler's many comedy albums, and frequently receives co-songwriting credits on the original songs that Sandler performs in many of his films.

Covert appeared as himself, along with Adam Sandler, in an episode of the television series Undeclared. The show's creator, Judd Apatow, is another friend and former college classmate of Covert and Sandler.

Covert is a cofounder of Cherry Tree Books, a publisher of eBooks for children.

Filmography

References

External links

1964 births
20th-century American male actors
21st-century American male actors
American children's writers
Film producers from California
American male comedy actors
American male film actors
American male screenwriters
American male television actors
American stand-up comedians
Comedians from California
Comedians from Florida
Jewish American male actors
Jewish American male comedians
Jewish American screenwriters
Living people
Male actors from Florida
Male actors from Los Angeles
People from West Palm Beach, Florida
Screenwriters from Florida
Film producers from Florida
Screenwriters from California
20th-century American comedians
21st-century American comedians
21st-century American Jews